Abu Sadat Mohammad Sayem (29 March 1916 – 8 July 1997) was a Bangladeshi jurist and statesman. He was first Chief Justice of Bangladesh from 1972 to 1975. He became the President of Bangladesh in the aftermath of counter-coups in November 1975. He was made Chief Martial Law Administrator. Sayem presided over a cabinet headed by the three chiefs of the armed forces. The cabinet included civilian technocrats and politicians. Sayem resigned on grounds of ill health in April 1977, and was replaced by President Ziaur Rahman.

Early life
Sayem was born on 29 March 1916 in Rangpur district, Bengal Presidency, British India. He attended the Rangpur District School and Carmichael College. He later attended Presidency College in Calcutta and graduated from the University Law College of Calcutta University.

Career
Sayem started working as an advocate at the Calcutta High Court in 1944. After partition of India in 1947, he moved to Dhaka, East Bengal, Pakistan. He joined the newly established Dhaka High Court. He joined the law firm Sher-e-Bangla AK Fazlul Huq as a junior advocate. He was elected secretary of  Dhaka High Court Bar Association. He was later elected vice president of the Bar association. He was a member of the East Pakistan Lawyers’ Association. He would be elected Secretary, Secretary General, and the vice-president of the East Pakistan Lawyers’ Association.

Sayem was also elected to the local board of the State Bank of Pakistan. He was appointed judge in the Dhaka High Court on 3 July 1962. He served in the Commission of Enquiry for finding out the causes of exodus and eviction of the members of the minority community in 1967. In 1970 he was appointed to the Delimitation Commission responsible for the delimitation of parliamentary constituencies. He was appointed to the Election Commission.

In 1971, Bangladesh became an independent country following the Bangladesh Liberation war. On 12 January 1972, Sayem was made the Chief Justice of Bangladesh High Court. On 17 December 1972, he was made the Chief Justice of Bangladesh following the creation of Bangladesh Supreme Court. He gave the verdict on the important Berubari Case concerning the exchange of enclaves between Bangladesh and India.

Sayem assumed the office of President and Chief Martial Law Administrator on 6 November 1975 following the 3 November 1975 Bangladesh coup d'état by Brigadier General Khaled Mosharraf. On 29 November 1976, He removed himself from the office of the Chief Martial Law Administrator and was replaced by Major General Ziaur Rahman, Chief of Army Staff. On 21 April 1977, he resigned from the presidency of Bangladesh on health grounds. Major General Ziaur Rahman succeeded him as the president of Bangladesh.

Death 
He died on 8 July 1997 in Dhaka, Bangladesh.

References

1916 births
1997 deaths
Awami League politicians
Supreme Court of Bangladesh justices
Presidents of Bangladesh
University of Calcutta alumni
Chief justices of Bangladesh
Carmichael College alumni